Habib Abdulrab Sarori (born 1956) is a Yemeni computer scientist and novelist. He was born in Aden and pursued higher studies in France, obtaining a master's degree in Informatics from the University of Paris 6 in 1983, followed by a PhD from the University of Rouen in 1987. He is currently a professor in the Mathematical and Software Engineering Department at Rouen and also at INSA de Rouen. He has published numerous scientific papers over the last two decades. He is also the author of textbooks in computer science.

Abdulrab has published literary works in both French and Arabic. His novel La reine étripée was published in 2000. He has also written short stories and novels in Arabic, his most recent novel being Arwa. His short story The Bird of Destruction was published in English translation in Banipal magazine, in an issue devoted to contemporary Yemeni writing. He also published two other books, the first one being Production System Engineering, the second one being Suslov's Daughter. Suslov's Daughter was longlisted for the 2015 International Prize for Arabic Fiction, and Darf Publishers published an English translation by Elisabeth Jaquette in 2017.

References

1956 births
Living people
Yemeni writers
Yemeni novelists
Yemeni academics
People from Aden
Yemeni expatriates in France
Yemeni scientists
20th-century Yemeni writers
21st-century Yemeni writers
Academic staff of the University of Rouen Normandy